"My Favorite Girl" is a song co-written and performed by American contemporary R&B singer Dave Hollister, issued as the lead single from his debut studio album Ghetto Hymns. The song peaked at number 39 on the Billboard Hot 100 in 1999.

Music video

The official music video for the song was directed by Steve Carr.

Charts

Weekly charts

Year-end charts

References

External links
 
 

1998 songs
1999 singles
DreamWorks Records singles
Dave Hollister songs
Music videos directed by Steve Carr
Song recordings produced by Erick Sermon
Songs written by Dave Hollister
Songs written by Stevie J
Songs written by Marc Kinchen